Paul David Tonko (born June 18, 1949) is an American politician serving as the U.S. representative for  since 2013. He represented the 21st congressional district from 2009 to 2013. A member of the Democratic Party, Tonko has been called a staunch progressive. After the 2020 redistricting cycle and effective for the 118th Congress, the 20th district will include all of Albany County, Saratoga County and Schenectady County, as well as part of Rensselaer County.

From 1983 to 2007, Tonko represented the 105th district in the New York State Assembly. He was appointed to serve as president and CEO of the New York State Energy Research and Development Authority from 2007 until his resignation in April 2008. Soon afterward, he declared his candidacy for Congress, and was elected in November 2008.

Tonko is the ranking member of the House Energy and Commerce Subcommittee on Environment, Manufacturing, and Critical Materials in the 118th Congress. Since 2013, he has been the highest-ranking Democrat on the panel, which authorizes, oversees and investigates the Environmental Protection Agency (EPA).

Early life, education and early career
Tonko is a lifelong resident of Amsterdam, New York, near Schenectady, and is of primarily Polish descent. He graduated from Amsterdam's Wilbur H. Lynch High School in 1967, and received a degree in mechanical and industrial engineering from Clarkson University in Potsdam, New York in 1971.

An engineer for the New York Public Service Commission, Tonko became active in local politics in the early 1970s and successfully ran for the Montgomery County Board of Supervisors. He was a member of the board from 1976 to 1983, and the board's chairman from 1981 to 1983. Tonko was the youngest person in county history to be elected to the board of supervisors.

New York State Assembly (1983–2007)
In January 1983, Assemblywoman Gail S. Shaffer resigned her 105th district seat to take office as Secretary of State of New York. The Democratic Party, as well as the Liberal Party, nominated Tonko to contest an April 12 special election for the seat against former Schoharie County Clerk Eugene Hallock, the Republican and Conservative nominee. Tonko defeated Hallock in a close race. Tonko was reelected 13 times, serving in the Assembly until 2007.

While in the Assembly, Tonko served as chair of the Energy Committee from 1992 until his departure from the Assembly in 2007. He was also a member of standing committees on Agriculture, Transportation and Education, where he was the original sponsor and a chief proponent of the College Tuition Savings Program that was signed into law in 1997.

Tonko sponsored Timothy's Law, a 2006 law that requires health insurers to cover mental health treatment. He also sponsored the Northeast Dairy Compact, and chaired the Legislative Commission on Rural Resources,

Tonko resigned his Assembly seat in June 2007 to become President and CEO of the New York State Energy Research and Development Authority.

U.S. House of Representatives (2009–present)

Elections

2008

On April 25, 2008, Tonko stepped down from his position at the New York State Energy Research and Development Authority after ten-term Democratic Congressman Michael McNulty announced his upcoming retirement from Congress. He subsequently entered the race to succeed McNulty in the 21st district. Tonko won the Democratic primary on September 9, defeating four other candidates.

In the November 4 general election, Tonko defeated Republican Schenectady County Legislator James Buhrmaster by a decisive margin. According to the Times Union, "Tonko's name recognition ... accomplishment in the Legislature, such as the passage of mental health parity legislation, and his record" contributed to his win. He had effectively clinched a seat in Congress in the primary; the 21st had long been the only safe Democratic district in the state outside the New York City, Buffalo and Rochester areas.

2010–present
Tonko ran for reelection on the Democratic, Working Families and Independence Party lines. He was challenged by Republican and Conservative Party nominee Ted Danz, a former United States Navy Reservist and small business owner in the cooling and heating business. Tonko raised almost $980,000, and spent almost $780,000 on his campaign; Danz raised about $44,000 and spent about $42,000 on his campaign. The New York Times rated the seat "Solid Democratic", with a "99.8%" to "100% chance" that Tonko would win. The major issues in the 2010 race were Tonko's votes for Obamacare, the Stimulus Package (ARRA), and the Energy Bill. The Albany Times Union endorsed Tonko, citing "a way of thinking and speaking like the engineer that he once was" and his support of the economic stimulus bill and health care bills. Tonko won the November 2 general election, 124,889 votes to 85,752.

Redistricting saw Tonko's district renumbered the 20th district. It lost much of its more rural territory to the west. To make up for the loss in population, it was pushed further into Saratoga County. The new 20th was no less Democratic than the old 21st, and Tonko defeated Bob Dieterich in 2012, Jim Fischer in 2014, and Joe Vitollo in 2016 and 2018. He defeated Liz Joy in 2020 and 2022.

Tenure 
Tonko was one of the 19 most liberal House members, according to the National Journal, for 2011.

When he entered Congress, Tonko said he wanted to focus on the issue he said he knows best—energy policy. He sponsored a bill to create an $800 million research program in wind energy technologies, which would benefit GE in his district. He also wanted to create a research program to improve the efficiency of gas turbines used in power generation systems that convert heat into energy. In 2010, Tonko got a provision in a House-passed bill, following the BP disaster in the Gulf of Mexico, to prevent future spills and help small businesses in spill research. In 2011, he sponsored an amendment seeking to protect the Environmental Protection Agency's authority to regulate carbon emissions.

Tonko praised the 2011 State of the Union address, saying, "the President set out a bold agenda for our nation, an agenda that will focus on growing our economy, growing jobs, and growing opportunity for the middle class". He has also often warned of the threat that Obamacare's repeal would pose to small businesses, young people, and seniors.

Tonko has worked to raise awareness about the region's waterways, chiefly the Hudson and Mohawk rivers, and the effects of flooding after Hurricane Irene. Seeking a comprehensive flood mitigation and economic development strategy, Tonko introduced the Hudson-Mohawk Basin Act in 2012.

Tonko became a prominent opponent of the Trans Pacific Partnership (TPP) in 2015, citing American trade deficits and the use of child labor by at least four countries that had already signed the pact as among his reasons for opposing the deal.

In 2017, Tonko was one of three Catholic politicians whom Bishop Edward Bernard Scharfenberger of Albany publicly rebuked for participating in a rally supporting Planned Parenthood.

In January 2019, Tonko—a member of the House Energy and Commerce Committee—was named chair of that committee's Subcommittee on the Environment and Climate Change.

On October 1, 2020, Tonko co-signed a letter to Secretary of State Mike Pompeo that condemned Azerbaijan’s offensive operations against the Armenian-populated enclave of Nagorno-Karabakh, denounced Turkey’s role in the Nagorno-Karabakh conflict, and criticized "false equivalence between Armenia and Azerbaijan, even as the latter threatens war and refuses to agree to monitoring along the line of contact."

In 2022, Tonko was instrumental in passing provisions contained in the CHIPS and Science Act (PL 117-167) into law.

Syria
In 2023, Tonko was among 56 Democrats to vote in favor of H. Con. Res. 21, which directed President Joe Biden to remove U.S. troops from Syria within 180 days.

Committee assignments
Committee on Energy and Commerce
Subcommittee on Environment, Manufacturing and Critical Materials (Ranking Member)
Subcommittee on Energy, Climate and Grid Security
Subcommittee on Oversight and Investigations
Committee on Science, Space & Technology

Caucus memberships
Tonko is a member of more than 65 House caucuses. Below is a small sample of his memberships:
Congressional Progressive Caucus
Congressional Addiction, Treatment and Recovery Caucus (Vice Chair)
Bicameral Congressional Caucus on Parkinson's Disease
Bipartisan Congressional Task Force on Alzheimer's disease
Congressional Army Caucus
Congressional Arts Caucus 
Congressional Biomass Caucus
Heritage Corridor Caucus
Congressional Safe Climate Caucus
Congressional Lesbian, Gay, Bisexual, and Transgender (LGBT) Equality Caucus
Congressional Mental Health Caucus
Congressional Voting Rights Caucus
House Manufacturing Caucus
House Renewable Energy and Energy Efficiency Caucus
House Baltic Caucus
Medicare for All Caucus
Blue Collar Caucus

See also
Energy law

References

External links

Congressman Paul D. Tonko official U.S. House website
Paul Tonko for Congress

|-

|-

|-

1949 births
20th-century American politicians
21st-century American politicians
American Roman Catholics
American politicians of Polish descent
Clarkson University alumni
Democratic Party members of the United States House of Representatives from New York (state)
Living people
Democratic Party members of the New York State Assembly
People from Amsterdam, New York
Catholics from New York (state)